George Thiemeyer Hemmeter (1906 – April 8, 2000) was an American inventor primarily known for inventing the Newspaper vending machine. He also worked on other ideas for devices such as a food dehydrator used during the second world war, and a self-balancing washing machine.

References

1906 births
2000 deaths
20th-century American engineers
20th-century American inventors